The 1952 Mercer Bears baseball team represented the Mercer Bears  in the 1952 NCAA baseball season.

References

Mercer
Mercer Bears baseball seasons
Mercer baseball